Faulk County is a county in the U.S. state of South Dakota. As of the 2020 census, the population was 2,125. Its county seat is Faulkton. The county was founded in 1873 and organized in 1883. It is named for Andrew Jackson Faulk, the third Governor of Dakota Territory.

Geography
The terrain of Faulk County consists of low rolling hills, largely devoted to agriculture, sloping to the east. The highest point of the terrain is the county's SW corner, at 1,916' (584m) ASL.

Major highways

 U.S. Highway 212
 South Dakota Highway 20
 South Dakota Highway 45
 South Dakota Highway 47

Adjacent counties

 Edmunds County – north
 Brown County – northeast
 Spink County – east
 Hand County – south
 Hyde County – southwest
 Potter County – west

Protected areas
 Lake Faulkton State Game Refuge
 Ingalls State Game Production Area
 Gerkin State Game Production Area & Wildlife Refuge
 Lake Faulkton State Game Production Area
 Lake Faulkton State Lakeside Use Area
 North Scatterwood Lake State Waterfowl Refuge
 Sprague State Game Production Area
 South Scatterwood State Game Production Area

Lakes

 Clark Lake
 Lake Creabard
 Lake Faulkton
 North Scatterwood Lake (partial)
 South Scatterwood Lake
 Zell Lake

Demographics

2000 census
As of the 2000 United States Census, there were 2,640 people, 1,014 households, and 708 families in the county. The population density was 3 people per square mile (1/km2). There were 1,235 housing units at an average density of 1.3 per square mile (0.5/km2). The racial makeup of the county was 99.47% White, 0.08% Black or African American, 0.15% Native American, 0.04% Asian, and 0.27% from two or more races. 0.23% of the population were Hispanic or Latino of any race. 65.0% were of German, 6.2% American and 5.2% Norwegian ancestry.

There were 1,014 households, out of which 28.90% had children under the age of 18 living with them, 63.40% were married couples living together, 3.40% had a female householder with no husband present, and 30.10% were non-families. 29.10% of all households were made up of individuals, and 16.30% had someone living alone who was 65 years of age or older. The average household size was 2.56 and the average family size was 3.18.

The county population contained 26.60% under the age of 18, 5.40% from 18 to 24, 23.10% from 25 to 44, 22.00% from 45 to 64, and 22.90% who were 65 years of age or older. The median age was 42 years. For every 100 females there were 99.80 males. For every 100 females age 18 and over, there were 97.70 males.

The median income for a household in the county was $30,237, and the median income for a family was $34,508. Males had a median income of $25,085 versus $16,346 for females. The per capita income for the county was $14,660. About 12.60% of families and 18.10% of the population were below the poverty line, including 24.60% of those under age 18 and 7.80% of those age 65 or over.

2010 census
As of the 2010 United States Census, there were 2,364 people, 869 households, and 532 families in the county. The racial makeup of the county was 98.9% white, 0.1% Asian, 0.1% American Indian, 0.1% black or African American, 0.0% from other races, and 0.7% from two or more races. Those of Hispanic or Latino origin made up 0.8% of the population. In terms of ancestry, 70.0% were German, 9.6% were Irish, 7.1% were English, 5.7% were Norwegian, and 4.3% were American.

Of the 869 households, 20.6% had children under the age of 18 living with them, 54.9% were married couples living together, 4.1% had a female householder with no husband present, 38.8% were non-families, and 36.1% of all households were made up of individuals. The average household size was 2.15 and the average family size was 2.79. The median age was 46.9 years.

The median income for a household in the county was $38,203 and the median income for a family was $55,234. Males had a median income of $40,641 versus $23,571 for females. The per capita income for the county was $21,898. About 14.4% of families and 17.9% of the population were below the poverty line, including 15.3% of those under age 18 and 14.3% of those age 65 or over.

Communities

City
 Faulkton (county seat)

Towns

 Chelsea
 Cresbard
 Onaka
 Orient
 Rockham
 Seneca

Census-designated places 

 Blumengard Colony
 Brentwood Colony
 Evergreen Colony
 Thunderbird Colony

Unincorporated communities

 Miranda
 Norbeck
 Wecota
 Zell

Townships

Arcade
Bryant
Centerville
Clark
Devoe
Ellisville
Elroy
Emerson
Enterprise
Fairview
Freedom
Hillsdale
Irving
Lafoon
Latham
Myron
O'Neil
Orient
Pioneer
Pulaski
Saratoga
Seneca
Sherman
Tamworth
Thirteen
Union
Wesley
Zell

Politics
Faulk County voters have largely voted Republican for several decades. In only two national elections since 1944 has the county selected the Democratic Party candidate (as of 2020).

See also
 National Register of Historic Places listings in Faulk County, South Dakota

References

 
1883 establishments in Dakota Territory
Populated places established in 1883